Gretzky is the debut full-length album by Canadian instrumental progressive metal band Electro Quarterstaff.  It is named after hockey legend Wayne Gretzky and follows the trend of the band naming their releases as the last name of a male celebrity a trend that had begun on their first EP, Swayze (named for Patrick Swayze); it continued with the release of their second LP, Aykroyd.

Track listing 
 "Neckwrecker" – 6:56
 "Twisted Squid" – 5:24
 "Charmony" – 6:38
 "The Right to Arm Bears" – 6:24
 "Get Sick" – 7:10
 "Titanium Overlords" – 5:24
 "Eyepatch Romance" – 2:41
 "Something's Awry in the Hetfield of Dreams" – 10:53

Personnel
 Andrew Dickens – guitar 
 Josh Bedry – guitar, OC-3 on "Charmony"
 Drew Johnston – guitar, OC-3 on all songs except "Charmony"
 Dan Ryckman – drum kit

References

External links
 Review of Gretzky by Decibel Magazine
 EQ article about the recording of the album

2006 debut albums
Cultural depictions of Wayne Gretzky
Electro Quarterstaff albums
Willowtip Records albums